Bílina is a town in Teplice District in the Ústí nad Labem Region of the Czech Republic. It has about 14,000 inhabitants. It is known for its spas and as a source of the strongly mineralized water, Bílinská kyselka. The town centre is well preserved and is protected by law as an urban monument zone.

Administrative parts

Bílina is made up of six town parts: Bílina, Chudeřice, Mostecké Předměstí, Pražské Předměstí, Teplické Předměstí and Újezdské Předměstí.

Etymology
The name of the town originates from the adjective "white" (bielý in Old Czech). The term Bielina ("white/bald place") is etymologically derived either from fact there was an area without any wood or from sparkling waters of the river Bílina (formerly called Bělá).

Geography

It lies on the border between the Most Basin and Central Bohemian Uplands. It is situated in the valley of the Bílina River.

The town is dominated by two features. The steep hill Bořeň is a large phonolite hill, dominating the town and its surroundings. It lies in the eponymous national nature reserve. The second feature is the giant brown coal mine Bílina which seriously changed and damaged surrounding landscape.

History

Middle Ages
During the 10th century, the era of making Bohemian (Czech) state, a gord was built here by Bohemian rulers as a defence point against German raids from neighbouring Saxon Eastern March (part of the Holy Roman Empire). The first written mention of Bílina is from 993 on a privilege of Pope John XV, when it was a seat of a province. A record in Chronica Boemorum describes a battle between Duke Bretislaus I and the German Emperor Henry III near the gord in 1040–1041.

Before the half of the 13th century knight Ojíř of Friedberg built a new castle in the settlement, which was expanded into a mediaeval town with bulwarks and three gates in the second half of the 14th century. Since the 2nd half of the 13th century German settlers were called into the border areas of the Bohemian Kingdom, introducing German town law; it was also the case with Bílina town which is first mentioned as a regular chartered town (civitas) in 1289.

In 1407, Bílina was purchased by lord Albrecht of Koldice, well known for his anti-Hussite attitude. Thus, Bílina was surrounded and conquered by a Hussite hejtman Jakoubek of Vřesovice who returned Bílina to the Koldice family in 1436 and lords of Koldice kept the town until 1495.

After 1502, the town of Bílina was owned by the aristocratic family of Lobkowicz who later built on the place of Gothic castle a new château, designed by Swiss-Italian architect Antonio della Porta.

20th century
From October 1938 to May 1945, the town (with 60% of German inhabitants) was one of the municipalities in Sudetenland, part of the territory that Nazi Germany broke away from Czechoslovakia. During this period, Bílina was administered as a part of the Regierungsbezirk Aussig of Reichsgau Sudetenland. After the liberation of Czechoslovakia, almost all Germans from the town (and whole borderland area too) were expelled. The decline in population was replaced after the war by immigrants of Czech origin from Volhynia and Balkans, as well as Slovaks and Gypsies.

Another turning point in the history of town was a changeover in 1989, after the end of the Communist regime. Descendants of Lobkowicz family regained a part of their original property, including the spa; the spa was later sold to a private company.

Spa

Local springs of delicious mineral water began to be systematically exploited already in 1664. In 1702 Princess Eleonore of Lobkowicz had the mineral spring cleaned and the very first spa guests began to visit. By the end of 19th century the spa Biliner Sauerbrunn (meaning "Carbonated springs of Bílina" in German) had become the pride of the town. Bílina also received the nickname "Vichy of Germany". The digestive pastilles produced here also provided a worldwide common name for digestive regulators and laxatives: "Seidlitz Powders." The lozenges were made from the spring's mineral water Zaječická hořká, which was also used in the local spa balneology.

Scientific descriptions of the medicinal properties of local water treatment have contributed to the works of significant balneologists, including Franz Ambrosius Reuss, August Emanuel von Reuss and Josef von Löschner. Father and son Reuss are depicted in the spa Bílina memorial, which dominates the spa's central park.

In 1878 a large spa complex was built in a Renaissance Revival style, designed by the Lobkowicz family architect and builder Franz Sablik. Above the main spring, called "Joseph's Spring", a so-called spring temple was built, which protected it from the influences of the surroundings and at the same time allowed visitors to gather water as it was common in other European spas. Another building became popular among visitors: Forest Café, built as a timber pavilion in Swiss mountainous style.

At the beginning of the 20th century, the biggest importers were Germany and Russia. The most distant country where water was exported was Brazil (Rio de Janeiro).

Demographics

Sport
The town boasts a modern multipurpose stadium and a winter stadium with a capacity of 1,000 people. Thehe is also a swimming pool.

Sights

Lobkowicz château is a baroque castle built in the years 1676–1682 on the site of an earlier Gothic castle. A preserved Hussite bastion as a remnant of the massive town fortifications is in the eastern part of the caste complex. The castle is privately owned.

The town hall is a main landmark of the Mírové Square, historic town centre. It is an Art Nouveau building from 1908–1911. Marian column and a fountain on the square are from the second half of the 17th century.

The Church of Saints Peter and Paul is a parish church and historic monument. The original church was built already in 1061. The entire architecture blends Gothic and Renaissance elements, created during the reconstruction in 1573–1575, after the town was hit by a fire.

Kyselka spa complex includes the spring house of the mineral waters, cafes and natural amphitheatre in a forest setting.

Notable people
Johann Adalbert Angermeyer (1674–1742), German-Bohemian painter
August Emanuel von Reuss (1811–1873), Austrian geologist
Gustav Walter (1834–1910), Austrian opera singer
August Leopold von Reuss (1841–1924), Austrian ophthalmologist
Heinrich Krafft (1914–1942), German flying ace
Miloslav Stingl (1930–2020), ethnologist, traveller and author

Twin towns – sister cities

Bílina is twinned with:

 Biłgoraj, Poland
 Dippoldiswalde, Germany
 Jaraczewo, Poland
 Kobylí, Czech Republic
 Novovolynsk, Ukraine
 Stropkov, Slovakia

References

External links

 

Cities and towns in the Czech Republic
Populated places in Teplice District
Spa towns in the Czech Republic